Singing revolutionary songs, Reading classic books, Telling stories and Spreading mottos or Singing, Reading, Telling and Spreading is a political movement launched by Bo Xilai in Chongqing, People's Republic of China. It is one of Bo's two main political movements, along with Chongqing gang trials. Started in 2008, the movement caused impact around China.

Meanings
Singing revolutionary songs, commonly known as singing red songs, is singing songs that praise the Communist Party of China, the People's Liberation Army, the People's Republic of China and socialism. Bo aimed to instill patriotic feelings through the promotion of "red songs."
Reading classic books simply means reading classic quotations, poetry masterpieces, and excellent prose.
Telling stories specifically means telling stories about the history of the Communist Party of China.
Spreading mottos means spreading famous sayings, maxims, aphorisms or new creation of text fragments via text messages, microblogs and so on.

Reactions
Reactions to the red culture movement were divided. Bo's revival of Mao-era culture and accompanying social welfare programs were popular within certain segments of society, and made Bo popular with both Marxists and neo-leftists.  One student quoted in The Washington Post embraced the ethos of the campaign, saying, "When I sing red songs, I find a kind of spirit I never felt when singing modern songs …To surround yourself with material stuff is just a waste of time."  A group of retired participants in a red song routine told the Los Angeles Times "We know these songs from our youth. We grew up with revolutionary spirit and we want to pass that on to our children.” Another noted that he felt compelled to participate in order to express appreciation to the Communist Party for the country's strong economy.

However, the campaign was unsettling to others—particularly the intelligentsia. A 57-year-old lawyer told The Washington Post, "I saw the beatings of the teachers by the Red Guards. It was horrible …Young people may not recognize it. But for us who lived through it, how can we possibly sing?" An academic quoted in The Daily Telegraph described the mandatory campaign as akin to being "drowned in a Red sea."  In September 2009, a mid-level official in the city committed suicide after being pressured to organize his work unit to participate in the red songs campaign. The official, Xie Dajun, reportedly disagreed with the campaign, which evoked painful memories of the Cultural Revolution. Bo's critics and opponents derisively referred to him as "little Mao," with some expressing concern about the resemblance of the red culture campaign to the Cultural Revolution.

See also
Propaganda in China
Chongqing model#Red culture movement

References

2008 establishments in China
Political movements in China
Culture in Chongqing
Politics of Chongqing
Bo Xilai
Chinese New Left